The 1973 Navy Midshipmen football team represented the United States Naval Academy (USNA) as an independent during the 1973 NCAA Division I football season. The team was led by first-year head coach George Welsh.

Schedule

Roster

Game summaries

Army

References

Navy
Navy Midshipmen football seasons
Navy Midshipmen football